Higher alkanes are alkanes having nine or more carbon atoms. Nonane is the lightest alkane to have a flash point above 25 °C, and is not classified as dangerously flammable.

The term higher alkanes is sometimes used literally as "alkanes with a higher number of carbon atoms". One definition distinguishes the higher alkanes as the n-alkanes that are solid under natural conditions.

Uses 
Alkanes from nonane to hexadecane (those alkanes with nine to sixteen carbon atoms) are liquids of higher viscosity, which are less suitable for use in gasoline. They form instead the major part of diesel, kerosene, and aviation fuel. Diesel fuels are characterised by their cetane number, cetane being an older name for hexadecane. However the higher melting points of these alkanes can cause problems at low temperatures and in polar regions, where the fuel becomes too thick to flow correctly.  Mixtures of the normal alkanes are used as boiling point standards for simulated distillation by gas chromatography.

Alkanes from hexadecane upwards form the most important components of fuel oil and lubricating oil. In latter function they work at the same time as anti-corrosive agents, as their hydrophobic nature means that water cannot reach the metal surface. Many solid alkanes find use as paraffin wax, used for lubrication, electrical insulation, and candles. Paraffin wax should not be confused with beeswax, which consists primarily of esters.

Alkanes with a chain length of approximately 35 or more carbon atoms are found in bitumen (asphalt), used (for example) in road surfacing. However, the higher alkanes have little value and are usually split into lower alkanes by cracking.

Names 

Some alkanes have non-IUPAC trivial names: 
 cetane, for hexadecane
 cerane, for hexacosane

Properties 

The properties listed here refer to the straight-chain alkanes (or: n-alkanes).

Nonane to hexadecane 

This group of n-alkanes is generally liquid under standard conditions.

Heptadecane to tetracosane 

From this group on, the n-alkanes are generally solid at standard conditions.

Pentacosane to triacontane

Hentriacontane to hexatriacontane

Heptatriacontane to dotetracontane

Tritetracontane to octatetracontane

Nonatetracontane to tetrapentacontane

Pentapentacontane to hexacontane

See also
 Alkene
 Alkyne
 Cycloalkane
 Hydrocarbon
 Paraffin wax, composed mostly of higher linear alkanes
 Polyethylene, a linear alkane of polymeric length

References

External links 

 International Chemical Safety Card 1245 (nonane)
 NIOSH Pocket Guide to Chemical Hazards (nonane)
 International Chemical Safety Card 0428 (decane)

Alkanes